Enforcer from Death Row was a film that was directed by Marshall M. Borden and Efren C. Piñon. It starred Leo Fong, Booker T. Anderson, Ann Farber, Darnell Garcia, John Hammond, James Lew, Cameron Mitchell and Mariwin Roberts. The film has two different endings, depending on which release is watched. It is also known as Ninja Assassins, Ninja Nightmare  and Death Row Killer.

Background
The film was directed by two directors, Marshall M. Borden and Efren C. Piñon. The story was by Leo Fong and Jerry O. Tirazona. It was shot on location in the Philippines. The production companies were Koinonia PSI West Productions and Cinevision International Corporation. The film is also known as The Outside Man.

The star of the film, Leo Fong, was once a Methodist minister who grew up in Arkansas.

Story
An international peace keeping agency rescues a former Army Ranger from execution and sends him on a mission to bust up a dangerous spy ring.  T.L. Young (played by Leo Fong) is sent to the gas chamber and his death there is faked. He is offered $100,000 to stop the dangerous spy ring that has got hold of a deadly chemical weapon.

Viewing
In early 1982, it was playing in the Bronx at Loews Paradise. In Brooklyn it was showing at Loews Metropolitan and the Granada. In Queens it was showing at the Alden, and in Essex County it was showing at the Branford. It was released on VHS through 21st Genesis Home Video.

Releases

References

External links
 Imdb: Enforcer from Death Row
 Rotten Tomatoes: Enforcer from Death Row
 Bamboo Gods and Bionic Boys: Enforcer from Death Row (Ninja Nightmare)

1976 films
1970s action drama films
Philippine action films
Films directed by Efren C. Piñon
1976 drama films
1970s English-language films